Niccolò III d'Este (9 November 1383 – 26 December 1441) was Marquess of Ferrara from 1393 until his death. He was also a condottiero.

Biography
Born in Ferrara, the son of Alberto d'Este and Isotta Albaresani, he inherited the rule of the city in 1393 when only 10 years old. As a minor he was guided by a Regency Council supported by the Republics of Venice, Florence and Bologna.

In 1395 the troops of the Regency Council were attacked at the Battle of Portomaggiore by Niccolò's relative Azzo X d'Este, a descendant of Obizzo II d'Este, who contested Niccolò's right to rule in Ferrara due to his illegitimate birth, even though Niccolò had been legitimated by his father. However, Azzo's mercenary forces were defeated in the battle and Azzo himself taken prisoner and subsequently imprisoned by Astorre I Manfredi, commander of the Regency Council forces, thus removing the threat to Niccolò's rule.

In 1397 Niccolò married Gigliola da Carrara, daughter of Francesco II da Carrara, lord of Padua.

In 1403 he joined the league formed against Gian Maria Visconti, Duke of Milan, being appointed Captain General of the Papal Army by Pope Boniface IX. In 1405 he ceded the ancestral family lands near Este to Venice.

In 1410 the fighting master Fiore dei Liberi dedicated his treatise, the Fior di Battaglia, to him. In 1413 he made a pilgrimage to the Holy Land.  In 1418 he remarried to Parisina Malatesta, daughter of Andrea Malatesta. Two years later, fearing the ambitions of Filippo Maria Visconti, he ceded to him the possession of Parma.

In 1425 Niccolò had both his wife Parisina and his illegitimate son Ugo executed on charges of adultery, as well as decreeing that all women within his domains found to be guilty of adultery were to be put to death. He had to rescind this order once it was determined that this action would depopulate Ferrara. In that year he was again commander-in-chief of the anti-Visconti league. In 1429 his illegitimate son was named heir of the Marquisate.

The role of Niccolò as a prestigious leader in Italy was confirmed when his city was chosen as the seat of a council in 1438.

Marriages and children
Niccolò had children with at least eleven different women.

He married first Gigliola da Carrara, daughter of Francesco II da Carrara, lord of Padua in June 1397. She died of the plague in 1416. They had no known children.

He married secondly Parisina Malatesta, daughter of Andrea Malatesta. He had her executed on 21 May 1425 for allegedly having an affair with his illegitimate son Ugo d'Este. They had three children:

Ginevra d'Este (born 1419). Married her maternal relative Sigismondo Pandolfo Malatesta.
Luzia d'Este (24 March 1419 – 28 June 1437). Married Carlo Gonzaga of Milan, Lord of Sabbioneta.
Alberto Carlo d'Este (born and deceased in 1421).

He married thirdly Ricciarda of Saluzzo in 1429. She was a daughter of Thomas III of Saluzzo and Marguerite of Pierrepont. They had two children:

Ercole I d'Este (26 October 1431 – 15 June 1505).
Sigismondo d'Este (1433 – 1 April 1507).

He also had eleven illegitimate children:

Ugo d'Este (1405-1425). Son by Stella de' Tolomei. Executed by his father on 21 May 1425 for allegedly having an affair with his stepmother Parisina Malatesta
Meliaduse d'Este, Abbot of Pomposa and Ferrara, (1406–1452). Son by Caterina of Medici.
Leonello d'Este (1407–1450). Son by Stella de’ Tolomei.
Margherita d'Este (1411-1452). Married Galeotto Roberto Malatesta (1411-1432). Married Galassio II Pio.
Borso d'Este (1413–1471). Son by Stella de' Tolomei.
Alberto d'Este (1415 – 8 April 1502). Son by Filippa della Tavola.
Isotta d'Este (1425–1456). Daughter by Filippa della Tavola. Married first Oddantonio da Montefeltro, Duke of Urbino and secondly  Stjepan III Frankopan Modruški (Stephen Frangipani), Prince of Krk, Senj and Modruš, a member of Frankopan noble family (Croatia).
Beatrice d'Este (1427–1497). Married Niccolò of Correggio.
Rinaldo d'Este, Lord of Ostellato (c. 1435 – 1535). Son by Anna de Roberti.
Bianca Maria d'Este (18 December 1440 – 12 January 1506). Daughter by Anna de Roberti. Married Galeotto I Pico, Lord della Mirandola.
Gurone d'Este (d. 1484). An Abbot.
Camilla d'Este. Married Rodolfo da Varano of Camerino.

References
 L. A. Muratori. Delle antichità Estensi. 1717, Modena;
 G. B. Pigna. Historia dei Principi d'Este. 1570, Ferrara.
 Antonio Menniti Ippolito, Este, Niccolò III d’, in Dizionario Biografico degli Italiani, XLIII, Roma 1993, pp. 396–403.

Footnotes

External links
A listing of descendants of the d'Este family

1383 births
1441 deaths
Niccolo 3
Margraves of Ferrara
15th-century condottieri
14th-century Italian nobility
Burials at the Corpus Domini Monastery, Ferrara
Lords of Faenza